Major General Sir Robert Ferguson Lock KBE CB (13 December 1879 – 25 July 1957) was a British Army officer in the Royal Artillery who served during the First World War.

Career

Lock was commissioned a second lieutenant in the Royal Garrison Artillery on 23 June 1898, and promoted to lieutenant on 16 February 1901. He was seconded to take a course  of instruction at the School of Gunnery in 1903.

He was awarded the CB in 1937 and KBE in 1944.

Family
In 1910 he married Kathleen Beryl Penton, daughter of  Arthur Pole Penton CB, CMG, CVO in 1910.  They had a daughter Ursula whose second husband was the composer Ralph Vaughan Williams, another daughter, and a son Robert John Penton Lock who also served as an artilleryman in the Second World War, dying in 1944.

References

External links
Generals of World War II

1879 births
1957 deaths
British Army personnel of World War I
Royal Artillery officers
British Army generals of World War II
Knights Commander of the Order of the British Empire
Companions of the Order of the Bath
British Army major generals